Chandkhali Union is a union parishad in Paikgachha Upazila of Khulna District, in Khulna Division, Bangladesh.

References

Unions of Paikgachha Upazila
Populated places in Khulna District